Prisoners of the Maze is a fantasy role-playing game adventure module.

Plot summary
Prisoners of the Maze is a scenario for character levels 8-12, set in the World of Kalibruhn. The heroes must assassinate a mad tyrannical king. This it the first in the four-part "Maze of Zayene" series; Dimensions of Flight is the sequel.

Publication history
Prisoners of the Maze was written by Robert Kuntz, and was published by Creations Unlimited, Inc., in 1987 as a 32-page book.

This adventure was part of the Maze of Zayene series, a linked set of four adventures set in the World of Kalibruhn; work on them started in 1986, and they were all published in 1987. Prisoners of the Maze and Dimensions of Flight were based on adventures that Kuntz had created at college and that had subsequently been run at EastCon in 1983. 

When Kuntz partnered with Necromancer Games years later, he was thinking about his unpublished City of Brass but decided it would be easier to begin the Maze of Zayene. However, there was a several-month delay between the publication of the first and second Zayene adventures. While the first three Maze of Zayene adventures came out in 2001, the fourth and final book ultimately had to be published by Different Worlds in 2004.

Reception
According to Shannon Appelcline, although the adventures of the Maze of Zayene series "were unforgiving 'gauntlets' of the type that Kuntz enjoyed, they were somewhat unusual for the time because they had a political veneer laid out upon them – centring on a plot to assassinate a king. They also feature the evil wizard Zayene, who Kuntz intended to be a recurring villain, constantly returning to bedevil players."

References

Fantasy role-playing game adventures
Role-playing game supplements introduced in 1987